The 1st (United Kingdom) Division is an infantry division of the British Army, which was first formed in 1809 and disbanded for the final time in 2012. The division was commanded by a general officer commanding (GOC). In this role, the GOC received orders from a level above him in the chain of command, and then used the forces within the division to undertake the mission assigned. In addition to directing the tactical battle in which the division was involved, the GOC oversaw a staff and the administrative, logistical, medical, training, and discipline of the division. The division has had 81 different permanent GOCs over its history that has spanned over 200 years.

General officer commanding

Notes

References

Further reading

 
 

British Army personnel by war
British Army personnel of the Napoleonic Wars
British Army personnel of the Peninsular War
British Army personnel of the Crimean War
British Army personnel of the Second Boer War
British Army personnel of World War I
British Army personnel of World War II
British Army general officer commanding lists